Gymnosporangium libocedri, the Pacific Coast pear rust, is a plant pathogen and rust fungus.  It produces orange gelatinous growths (telia) on incense cedar in the spring.  Its secondary hosts include apple, crabapple, hawthorn, mountain ash, pear, quince, and serviceberry.

References

External links
PNW Plant Disease Handbook

Fungal plant pathogens and diseases
Pear tree diseases
Fungi described in 1908
Pucciniales